XFM, Xfm or xfm may refer to:

Xfm, former name of UK commercial radio station Radio X
XFM (Denmark), student radio station in Denmark
XFM Malta, commercial radio station in Malta
xfm (file manager)
Xandros File Manager
XFM (card specification) (aka Crossover Flash Memory), a JEDEC memory card specification
92.3 xFM, commercial radio station in Manila, Philippines
XFM 96.3, former commercial radio station in Singapore
XFM, commercial radio station in Malaysia
CJFX-FM, radio station in Antigonish, Nova Scotia, branded as 98.9 XFM
XHFO-FM, radio station in Mexico City, branded as XFM 92.1